Camp Fear (also known as The Millennium Countdown) is a 1991 direct-to-video science fiction/horror film starring Betsy Russell and Vincent Van Patten.

Cast
 Vincent Van Patten as Professor Hamilton 
 Betsy Russell as Jamie 
 Peggy Sands as Tiffany
 Mike Diamant as 'Frog'  
 George Buck Flower as Wino
 Tiny Ron Taylor as The Druid
 David Homb as Bill
 James Kratt as 'Ace'
 Nels Van Patten as 'Speedy'
 Sherman Augustus as Dancer #1
 Michelle Bauer as Dorm Girl
 Shannon Wilsey as Dorm Girl

External links
 
 
 
 A look at Camp Fear at "Retro Slashers"

1991 films
1991 horror films
1990s science fiction horror films
1990s slasher films

American independent films
American science fiction horror films
Apocalyptic films
Direct-to-video horror films
Films set in California
1991 independent films
1990s English-language films
1990s American films